Wan Gang (born August 1952) is a Chinese expert on automobiles and retired politician. He was formerly the president of Tongji University (2002–2007), the Minister of Science and Technology, the chairman of the China Zhi Gong Party, and a vice chairman of the Chinese People's Political Consultative Conference (2008-2023).

Biography 
Wan graduated from Northeast Forestry University. In 1979, he did his postgraduate study on experimental mechanics in Structural Theories Research Institute of Tongji University and received his master degree in 1981.

In the same year, he stayed on campus and taught mathematics and mechanics. In 1985, he went to Germany as a visiting scholar and doctoral candidate of Department of Mechanical Engineering in Clausthal University of Technology and received Ph.D (Dr.-Ing.) with good honor five years later.

In 1991, Wan began to work in German Audi Corporation, in charge of computer virtualization of automobile in the R&D Department. Soon he originated a distinctive auto-developing system for the company. In 1996, he was promoted to technical manager in production and technology division, and took charge of informational manufacturing technology as well as management. His leadership and contribution in many technological innovations facilitated the production of Audi A4, car of a new generation, thus winning for the company huge economic profits. In 1994 and 1995, he was consecutively invited as guest professor and doctoral supervisor at Clausthal University of Technology and of Tongji University. Under his instruction, his German doctoral candidates successfully carried out a researching project on fuel cell and they filled the blank of this field then and there.

In the year of 2000, Wan made a strategic proposal (“Regarding Development of Automobile New Clean Energy as the Starting Line for Leap- Forward of China’s Automobile Industry ”) to the State Council of China to develop a new type of automobile propelled by new clean fuel, with a view to ushering Chinese auto industry onto a new stage. His proposal received the attention and support from the Ministry of Science and Technology and the State Economic and Trade Commission. By the end of 2000, he returned China upon the invitation of the Ministry of Science and Technology and appointed as chief scientist and group leader of the 863 Program key electric automobile projects assigned by Ministry of Science and Technology. Also, he took the responsibility of major supervisor to handle the most demanding part in this project ---- the developing of fuel cell sedan, which deals with the most complicated technologies as well as the heaviest working load. This project was nominated as one of the “Ten Greatest Scientific and Technological Progresses of Chinese Higher Schools in 2005”.

In 2002, Wan worked as Assistant President of Tongji University; in 2003, Vice (Acting) President of Tongji; in July 2004, President of Tongji. He was also the founding dean of New Energy Automobile Engineering Center at Tongji.

Wan is a member of the standing committee of the 10th Chinese People's Political Consultative Conference. He has been chairman of the China Zhi Gong Party since December 2007 and a vice president in the Association for Science and Technology of Shanghai since 2006.

Wan was appointed the Minister of Science and Technology of the People's Republic of China on April 27, 2007.  He was the first cabinet minister from a non-Communist party since the late 1970s when China launched its economic reform and opening-up drive.

See also 
 Tiandihui

References 

Living people
1952 births
People's Republic of China politicians from Shanghai
Government ministers of the People's Republic of China
Northeast Forestry University alumni
Tongji University alumni
Knights Commander of the Order of Merit of the Federal Republic of Germany
Academic staff of Tongji University
Audi people
Vice Chairpersons of the National Committee of the Chinese People's Political Consultative Conference
China Zhi Gong Party politicians
Ministers of Science and Technology of the People's Republic of China
Clausthal University of Technology alumni